"The Factory" is a song written by Bud McGuire, and recorded by American country music artist Kenny Rogers. It was released in January 1988 as the third single from the album I Prefer the Moonlight.  The song reached number 6 on the Billboard Hot Country Singles & Tracks chart, number 4 in R&R, number 1 in Cashbox and number 1 in Gavin. Bud McGuire is the brother of Mike McGuire, founding member and drummer of the country music group Shenandoah.

Content
The song is about the life, dreams, hopes and struggles of McGuire's father, Harvey.

Charts

Weekly charts

Year-end charts

References

1988 singles
1987 songs
Kenny Rogers songs
Song recordings produced by Larry Butler (producer)
RCA Records singles